Lac de Flaine is a lake at Flaine in Haute-Savoie, France. Its surface and depth vary seasonly. Maximum depth can reach 10.5 m in May and only 0.75 m in winter, while the surface area varies from 12 ha to 1.5 ha.

Flaine